Pucono or Puconu is a hamlet in the left and southern bank of San Pedro River, Los Lagos commune, southern Chile.

References

Geography of Los Ríos Region
Populated places in Valdivia Province